Eucalyptus glaucescens, commonly known as the Tingiringi gum or Tingaringy gum, is a plant in the myrtle family Myrtaceae and is endemic to south-eastern Australia. It is a tree or mallee with smooth bark and dull greyish foliage growing in the higher parts of southern New South Wales and Victoria.

Description
The bark is smooth, grey, green or yellow and is shed in short ribbons. (Sometimes the bark on the lower part of the trunk of the tree form is rough or fibrous.) The juvenile leaves are arranged in opposite pairs, heart-shaped to more or less round and lack a peduncle. The flower caps are cone-shaped or hemispherical and much shorter than the rest of the bud.

Taxonomy and naming
Eucalyptus glaucescens was first formally described in 1929 by Joseph Maiden and William Blakely from a specimen collected on Tingiringi Mountain. The description was published in Volume 8 of  A Critical Revision of the Genus Eucalyptus, edited by Maiden. The specific epithet (glaucescens) is the incipient form of the Latin word glaucus meaning “blue-grey” or "blue-green", hence "becoming blue-grey or blue green".

Distribution and habitat
Tingiringi gum grows in shrubland on granite slopes on the southern tablelands of New South Wales south from the Australian Capital Territory to high mountain areas in Victoria.

References

External links 
 

glaucescens
Flora of New South Wales
Flora of Victoria (Australia)
Myrtales of Australia
Plants described in 1929